Thomas Maddison (16 December 1910 – unknown) was an English footballer who played for Mansfield Town. Maddison played twice for Mansfield in the 1933–34 season, both matches coming in cup competitions, against New Brighton in the FA Cup and Walsall in the Football League Third Division North Cup.

In December 1934, he joined SC Nimes, who played in the French Division 1.

References

1910 births
date of death unknown
English footballers
Association football defenders
Mansfield Town F.C. players
Year of death missing